Alejandro Delorte (born 2 June 1978, in Cabildo) is an Argentine football striker. He currently plays for Sansinena.

Career

Club career
Delorte started his professional career with Olimpo de Bahía Blanca in 2000. Along with Raul Oscar Schmidt and Jose Ramón Palacio, (Rodrigos's father), he is one of the most prolific players ever emerged from that club. In 2001, he helped Olimpo to win the Apertura 2001 title and promotion to the Primera División Argentina.

In 2005 Delorte joined Club de Gimnasia y Esgrima La Plata but he rejoined Olimpo in 2006 before moving to C.A. Peñarol in Uruguay and then Brescia Calcio in Italy.

Between 2007 and 2008 he played for Argentinos Juniors where his eight goals helped the club to qualify for Copa Sudamericana 2008.

Between 2008 and the beginning of 2009 he played for Aris Salonica. He joined Deportivo Táchira of Venezuela in 2009.

In 2011, he signed with Oriente Petrolero from Bolivia.

Titles

References

External links
 Argentine Primera statistics at Futbol XXI  
 

1978 births
Living people
Sportspeople from Bahía Blanca
Argentine footballers
Argentine expatriate footballers
Association football forwards
Club de Gimnasia y Esgrima La Plata footballers
Olimpo footballers
Peñarol players
Brescia Calcio players
Aris Thessaloniki F.C. players
Argentinos Juniors footballers
Deportivo Táchira F.C. players
Oriente Petrolero players
Gimnasia y Esgrima de Jujuy footballers
Gimnasia y Esgrima de Mendoza footballers
Estudiantes de Buenos Aires footballers
Deportivo Maipú players
San Martín de Burzaco footballers
Bella Vista de Bahía Blanca footballers
Club Atlético Sansinena Social y Deportivo players
Argentine Primera División players
Venezuelan Primera División players
Bolivian Primera División players
Primera Nacional players
Primera B Metropolitana players
Super League Greece players
Torneo Argentino A players
Torneo Argentino B players
Argentine expatriate sportspeople in Bolivia
Argentine expatriate sportspeople in Greece
Argentine expatriate sportspeople in Italy
Argentine expatriate sportspeople in Uruguay
Argentine expatriate sportspeople in Venezuela
Expatriate footballers in Bolivia
Expatriate footballers in Greece
Expatriate footballers in Italy
Expatriate footballers in Uruguay
Expatriate footballers in Venezuela